Dole (sometimes pronounced ) is a commune in the Jura department, of which it is a subprefecture (sous-préfecture), in the Bourgogne-Franche-Comté region, in Eastern France. In 2019, it had a population of 23,711.

History 
Dole was the capital of Franche-Comté until Louis XIV conquered the region; he shifted the parlement from Dole to Besançon. The university, founded by Duke Philippe le Bon of Burgundy in 1422, was also transferred to Besançon at that time.

In January 1573, Gilles Garnier was put to death after being found guilty of lycanthropy and witchcraft. He had confessed to murdering and cannibalizing at least six children.
The 1995 film Happiness Is in the Field was set in Dole and The Widow Couderc was also partially filmed there.

Geography 
Dole is located on the river Doubs.

Demographics

It is the largest commune in Jura, although the préfecture is Lons-le-Saunier.

Transport 
Dole-Ville station has rail connections to Dijon, Paris, Lausanne and Besançon. Dole – Jura Airport is located in the commune of Tavaux, 7 km southwest of Dole.

Famous residents 
 Simon Bernard (28 April 1779 – 5 November 1839)- Napoleonic aide de camp and notable engineer in the United States.
 Marie Émile Antoine Béthouart (17 December 1889 – 17 October 1982), soldier.
 Louis Pasteur (27 December 1822 – 28 September 1895), microbiologist and chemist
 Suzanne Douvillier, pioneer dancer and choreographer.
 Michel Chapuis  (15 January 1930 – 12 November 2017), organist
 Hubert-Félix Thiéfaine (21 July 1948 − ), pop-rock singer and songwriter, born in Dole

Museums 
The Museum of Fine Arts, Dole founded in 1821, is located in the House of the Officers, an example of military architecture of Franche-Comté at the 18th century.

Twin towns and sister cities
Dole is twinned with:

 Carlow, Ireland
 Chaohu, China
 Kostroma, Russia
 Lahr, Germany
 Northwich, England, United Kingdom
 Sestri Levante, Italy
 Tábor, Czech Republic

See also 
 Arrondissement of Dole
 Communes of the Jura department

References

External links 

  (in French)

Communes of Jura (department)
Subprefectures in France